Ronald Malcolm Hunt (26 September 1933 – April 1999) born in Colchester, England, was an English professional footballer who played as a wing half in the Football League.

Career
Hunt played for Colchester United his entire career, making over 150 appearances for the club. He helped the team to promotion to the Third Division in 1962 before retiring through injury in 1963. Following his retirement, Hunt managed local non-league club Mersea Island.

Honours

Club
Colchester United
 Football League Fourth Division Runner-up (1): 1961–62

References

External links
 
 Ron Hunt at Colchester United Archive Database

1933 births
English footballers
English football managers
Sportspeople from Colchester
Colchester United F.C. players
1999 deaths
Association football wing halves